30 Monocerotis is a single star in the equatorial constellation of Hydra, located 122 light years away from the Sun. It has the Bayer designation C Hydrae; 30 Monocerotis is the Flamsteed designation and was assigned when it belonged to the Monoceros constellation. The object is visible to the naked eye as a white-hued star with an apparent visual magnitude of 3.90. It is moving away from the Earth with a heliocentric radial velocity of +10 km/s.

This is an A-type main-sequence star with a stellar classification of A0 Va. It is around 162 million years old with a high rate of spin, showing a projected rotational velocity of 129 km/s. The star has 2.36 times the mass of the Sun and about 2.7 times the Sun's radius. It is radiating 40 times the luminosity of the Sun from its photosphere at an effective temperature of 10,281 K.

It is comparable in size to the asteroid belt. An unexplained X-ray emission has also been detected coming from these coordinates – stars of this class are not normally expected to show X-ray emission, so it may be coming from a background source or an unseen companion.

References

A-type main-sequence stars
Circumstellar disks
Hydra (constellation)
Hydrae, C
Durchmusterung objects
Monocerotis, 30
071155
041307
3314